Blood Alley is a 1955 American seafaring Cold War adventure film produced by John Wayne, directed by William A. Wellman, and starring Wayne and Lauren Bacall. The film was distributed by Warner Bros. and shot in CinemaScope and Warnercolor. The film depicts a voyage from Shanghai to Hong Kong via the Formosa Strait.

Plot
Captain Tom Wilder, an American Merchant Mariner, is taken prisoner after his ship is seized by the Chinese Communists. After two years in prison, he is helped to escape with both bribery and by disguising him as a Soviet army officer. A large Chinese man transports Wilder to Chiku Shan village without divulging why he was broken out of prison.

The village leader, Mr. Tso, tells Wilder he has been recruited to transport nearly 200 Chiku Shan residents out of Red China to freedom in the British port of Hong Kong. For the task, Captain Wilder must pilot a stolen, wood-burning, flat-bottomed, 19th Century stern-wheel riverboat. He will need to utilize his detailed memory of the China coast to draw a chart and navigate using an unreliable magnetic compass, and without a chronometer. Finally, he must rely upon the villagers' determination and resources to escape.

The villagers have been planning their escape for more than a year, gradually raising the harbor channel's bottom with stones in order to trap the local Red Chinese patrol boat once it has been lured inside. Sinking sampans loaded with rocks at the channel mouth will cause the patrol boat to run aground while the village escapes. The villagers have also been secretly accumulating arms, ranging from Browning machine guns to Mosin–Nagant rifles and Nagant revolvers. Their plan is complicated by having to bring along the large Communist Feng family so they will not be blamed for allowing the mass escape.

The villagers include the riverboat's Chief Engineer, a U.S. Navy-trained marine engineer named Tack, who helps steal the steamboat. Tack and Wilder bring the stern wheeler to Chiku Shan village where it is loaded with furnace firewood, boiler water, and all their provisions; it is re-christened with the village's name.

Wilder meets and is attracted to a tough and determined American woman named Cathy Grainger, whose father is a medical missionary in the village. Dr. Grainger was recently executed by the Red Chinese following unsuccessful surgery on a political commissar. To prevent her staying behind, Wilder tells Cathy about her father's death just before the villagers leave Chiku Shan, though she refuses to believe him.

Following their plan, the villagers lure the patrol boat into the harbor and trap it there. They flee down the coast in the stolen ferryboat, bluffing their way past a People's Liberation Army Navy destroyer. They disappear into a fog bank, hiding by day in shoreline reed marshes and sailing south only at night. The Fengs attempt to sabotage the escape, first by poisoning the food and water supply, then attempting and failing to take over Chiku Shan during a heavy storm. Cathy eventually comes to terms with her attraction to the gruff Captain Wilder.

A shortage of wood for fuel and water forces the Chiku Shan to pull into the Graveyard of Ships at Honghai Bay. Captain Wilder orders the wrecks stripped of wood and water siphoned from various depressions and abandoned tanks for both the boiler and for drinking water. A loose heavy timber suddenly plows through the stern wheel while mooring the steamboat, snapping two of the paddle blades. Wilder is forced to stay in the Graveyard longer than planned in order to make repairs. At the same time, Cathy goes ashore and returns after learning of her father's fate. The Fengs are put ashore, only to be taken back aboard when the pursuing Red Chinese destroyer begins shelling the Graveyard from a distance. It launches power boats to search for the ferry in the shallow harbor.

Chiku Shan makes a run for it into a marshy estuary, and disappears. Because smoke would reveal their position, the villagers both pole and tow the riverboat through miles of marshlands until reaching the open sea beyond the destroyer's search area. Tack fires up the boiler, and the steamboat proceeds to Hong Kong with the refugees. Their triumphant arrival is hailed by the steam whistles and ship sirens of every vessel in the harbor.

Cast
 John Wayne as Captain Tom Wilder
 Lauren Bacall as Cathy Grainger, a medical missionary's daughter
 Paul Fix as Mr. Tso, the senior village elder and headman
 Joy Kim as Susu, Cathy Grainger's housekeeper
 Berry Kroeger (Berry Kroger), as Old Feng, the Communist Feng family patriarch
 Mike Mazurki as Big Han, Wilder's First Mate
 Anita Ekberg as Wei Ling, Big Han's wife
 Henry Nakamura as Tack, the Chief Engineer
 James Hong as Communist Soldier (uncredited)
 Lowell Gilmore as British Officer (uncredited)

Production
The film's screenplay was written by Albert Sidney Fleischman, based on his novel, and was produced by Wayne's Batjac Productions. Location filming took place in and near China Camp, a shrimp fishing village in the San Francisco Bay. Additional filming occurred at Point Orient shrimp camp where the film crew was largely based in what is now known as Point San Pablo Yacht Harbor (located on Point San Pablo). Filming occurred at the Sacramento River, Stockton, California, and the northern California coast.

The Chinese Communist soldiers who search the village are armed with Model 1891 Mosin–Nagant rifles (probably ex-U.S. Rifle, 7.62 mm, Model of 1916 rifles) rather than the more appropriate Model 91/30s the Communists would have carried, having been exported to Mao's army during the Chinese Civil War. The determination as to model can be made in the scene where Captain Wilder is shown watching Mr. Feng in his car with the Mosin–Nagant laid across his knees. The single blade front sight and thick barrel bands of the Model 1891 are unmistakable.

Blood Alley is a nickname for the Formosa Strait. Blood Alley is a nickname for Rue Chu Pao-san, a short street off Avenue Edward VII, located in Shanghai, where Fleischman had visited as a sailor on the USS Albert T. Harris (DE-447). He was paid $5000 for the rights for his novel and was hired to write the screenplay.

The Communist patrol boat that the villagers trap on their artificial reef was actually a rescue boat on loan to the film company by the U.S. Air Force.

Casting
"Later, my dad (John Wayne) discovered that William Wellman drove Robert Mitchum to quit (though not necessarily to drink). The TV show This Is Your Life had once profiled Wellman. When the show’s producers asked the acclaimed director for a list of people to interview, Wellman included Mitchum, whose stalled career Wellman had boosted in 1946 by casting Mitchum as the lead in The Story of GI Joe. Mitchum told the producers, no, he didn’t have time to talk about William Wellman. When Wellman found out, he was livid. When the two men worked on Blood Alley, he took his revenge by badgering Mitchum around the clock."

Wayne plays a Merchant Marine captain in a role originally intended for Robert Mitchum prior to an altercation with the producers. Mitchum was fired from the production by Wellman. Wayne took over the lead after Gregory Peck turned the film down and Humphrey Bogart requested a large amount of money to assume the role.

Swedish actress Anita Ekberg, veteran actor Paul Fix, actor Berry Kroeger, and film character actor Mike Mazurki all play Chinese roles in Hollywood "yellowface".

Awards

Promotion
The film was promoted by the appearance of Wayne on the number-one rated television show, I Love Lucy.  In an unusual two-episode arc airing as the show's season opener on October 10, 1955, Lucy and Ethel steal Wayne's footprints from the forecourt of Grauman's Chinese Theatre the night before the premiere of Blood Alley, and complications ensue. During the second episode, a studio employee interrupts Wayne in his dressing room to show him a poster for Blood Alley. The film was also promoted during the closing credits.

Critical reception
Despite the star power of its lead actors and director, Blood Alley received a lukewarm reception from critics. The New York Times said, "Blood Alley, despite its exotic, oriental setting, is a standard chase melodrama patterned on a familiar blueprint." Today's critics have focused on Blood Alleys anti-communist aspect. DVD Talk called it "preposterous but entertaining" and said, "Wayne and Bacall have no chemistry at all".

Home Media
Blood Alley was released on DVD May 4, 2005 by Warner Bros. Home Video. The film was re-released on Blu-ray July 18, 2017 by the Warner Archive Collection.

See also
 List of American films of 1955
 John Wayne filmography
 Soldier of Fortune (1955 film), a movie with a similar plot

References

External links
 
 
 
 

1955 films
1955 adventure films
American adventure films
Films set in China
Cold War films
Batjac Productions films
Warner Bros. films
Films scored by Roy Webb
Films directed by William A. Wellman
Films produced by John Wayne
CinemaScope films
1950s English-language films
1950s American films